The Rolf Schock Prizes were established and endowed by bequest of philosopher and artist Rolf Schock (1933–1986). The prizes were first awarded in Stockholm, Sweden, in 1993 and, since 2005, are awarded every three years. Each recipient currently receives SEK 400,000 (approximately US$60,000). A similar prize is the Kyoto Prize in Arts and Philosophy, established by the Inamori Foundation. It is considered the equivalent of the Nobel Prize in Philosophy.

The Prizes are awarded in four categories and decided by committees of three of the Swedish Royal Academies:

Logic and Philosophy (decided by the Royal Swedish Academy of Sciences)
Mathematics (decided by the Royal Swedish Academy of Sciences)
Visual Arts (decided by the Royal Swedish Academy of Arts)
Musical Arts (decided by the Royal Swedish Academy of Music)

Laureates in Logic and Philosophy

Laureates in Mathematics

Laureates in Visual Arts

Laureates in Musical Arts

See also

Fields Medal
Kyoto Prize in Arts and Philosophy
Astrid Lindgren Memorial Award
Nevanlinna Prize
Nobel Prize
Polar Music Prize
Right Livelihood Award
Turing Award
Lists of awards
List of European art awards
 List of mathematics awards

References

External links
2022 Rolf Schock Prize
List of Laureates

Visual arts awards
Mathematics awards
Philosophy awards
 
Awards of the Royal Swedish Academy of Sciences
Swedish music awards
1993 establishments in Sweden
Awards established in 1993